Karahüyük can refer to:

 Karahüyük, Acıpayam
 Karahüyük, Kalecik